Enzor may refer to:
 Jamar Enzor (born 1981), American football player
 Jeff Enzor, member of the band Joyce Manor